Camilo Andrés Moya Carreño (born 19 March 1998) is a Chilean professional footballer who currently plays for Chilean Primera División club O'Higgins as a midfielder.

Club career
Moya began playing football in Universidad de Chile's youth system. during his term with Universidad de Chile, he was loaned to Spanish club Getafe B and San Luis de Quillota in 2017 and 2018, respectively.

In June 2022, he joined O'Higgins after ending his contract with Universidad de Chile.

International career
Moya played for Chile U17 at the 2015 FIFA U-17 World Cup finals, helping Chile reach the knock-out stage.

References

External links
 
 Camilo Moya at playmakerstats.com (English version of ceroacero.es)

Living people
1998 births
Footballers from Santiago
Chilean footballers
Chilean expatriate footballers
Chile youth international footballers
Association football midfielders
Universidad de Chile footballers
Getafe CF B players
San Luis de Quillota footballers
O'Higgins F.C. footballers
Chilean Primera División players
Tercera Federación players
Expatriate footballers in Spain
Chilean expatriate sportspeople in Spain